The practice of doping in tennis involves the use of prohibited, performance-enhancing substances listed by the International Tennis Federation (ITF) and World Anti-Doping Agency (WADA). The practice is considered unsportsmanlike and unethical, with punishments for such offences ranging from official warnings to career bans, depending on the severity of the offence.

Widespread illegal substance abuse in tennis developed during the 1980s and 1990s as performance-enhancing substances became increasingly available in professional sport. The detection and punishment for the use of drugs in this period was aided by the takeover of policing drug cheating by the International Tennis Federation in 1993.

History 
Anti-doping policy within tennis primarily developed from the 1980s with the increased prevalence of recreational drugs and steroid use among athletes across various sporting professions.

According to the International Tennis Federation (ITF), the Men's Tennis Council began drug testing in the late 1980s. The drug testing program that was administered by the Men's Tennis Council targeted recreational drugs such as cocaine, methamphetamine and marijuana, before the creation of the ATP Tour in 1990 marked an official transition towards performance-enhancing drug regulation.

From 1993, the Women's Tennis Association (WTA World Tour), Association of Tennis Professionals (ATP World Tour) and International Tennis Federation (ITF) led a combined anti-doping initiative in professional tennis.

Following the joint initiative between the ATP and WTA, the International Tennis Federation (ITF) became the sole governing body for professional tennis anti-doping initiatives in 2007, as the Association of Tennis Professionals (ATP World Tour) and Women's Tennis Association (WTA World Tour) moved towards a player-focused organisation and administrative role. Other bodies that regulate doping within tennis on a national level include the United States Anti-Doping Agency.

Doping in men's tennis

Andre Agassi (1997) 

In 1997, Andre Agassi returned a positive drug test for the use of methamphetamine. A joint investigation carried out by the World Anti-Doping Agency (WADA) and Association of Tennis Professionals (ATP World Tour) handed down a three-month suspension from professional tennis for the incident. However, the punishment was not formally handed down after Agassi blamed the positive result on a spiked drink.

Agassi's case was revisited in 2009 following the publication of Agassi's autobiography, Open: An Autobiography, where Agassi admitted to lying about the cause of his positive drug test result. Agassi admitted that he became addicted to methamphetamine during 1997 after his assistant introduced him to the drug and he faced both personal and professional problems.

Following the admission, no formal case has been opened against Agassi as the offence was committed prior to the establishment of the World-Anti Doping Agency in 1999 and the International Tennis Federation's (ITF) formal takeover of the ATP World Tour's anti-doping program since 2007.

Richard Gasquet (2009) 
In 2009, Richard Gasquet returned a positive drug result for cocaine use. Gasquet denied intentional use of the drug, citing that he may have been exposed to the substance after kissing a female at a Miami nightclub (known in the media as "The Cocaine Kiss Controversy").
The International Tennis Federation (ITF) and the World Anti-Doping Agency were initially seeking a two-year ban because of the substance used in the incident. Due to Gasquet's denial, and the small amount of cocaine detected, Gasquet initially received a one-year ban. However, this was overturned following an independent review that found the case was unintentional. The ITF and WADA challenged the ruling in the Court of Arbitration for Sport but were unsuccessful. 
Consequently, Gasquet received a formal six-week ban that came into effect in May 2009 to July 2009, which prevented him from competing in the French Open or Wimbledon. During this period his professional ranking fell nine places. This was the only punishment enforced by governing authorities, with no prize money fine or forfeiture of ranking being imposed. An independent tribunal ruled that Gasquet had not intentionally consumed the substance, that it was not performance-enhancing, and that he would have consumed the bare minimum amount to be detected.

In January 2010, the Court of Arbitration for Sport found Gasquet not guilty of a doping offence and he returned to professional tennis following the ban at the Australian Open in 2010.

Marin Čilić (2013) 
In 2013, Marin Čilić returned a positive drug test for the substance nikethamide. The drug is a widely used stimulant that affects respiratory function through the increase in blood flow and oxygen intake within the body.

Čilić denied having deliberately taken the drug, stating that the substance was contained in glucose tablets that were purchased from a pharmacy while he was competing in France. The International Tennis Federation (ITF) recognised Cilic's claim and did not hand down the regular two-year professional ban for instances of illegal doping. Instead, he received a nine-month ban due to the low level of the drug that was detected and the contextual circumstances.
The initial ban would have prevented Čilić from competing in the 2013 US Open and the 2014 Australian Open with the suspension period extending from May 1, 2013, to January 31, 2014. However, following a successful appeal to the Court of Arbitration for Sport, Čilić's nine-month ban was reduced to four months, with a retrospective provisioning period recognising time already spent away from the game. The ruling also resulted in the return of Čilić's prize money and ATP World Tour points from the 2013 French Open, 2013 Wimbledon and 2013 BMW Open where he tested positive to nikethamide.

Cilic returned to the professional tennis circuit on 25 October 2013.

Viktor Troicki (2013) 

In 2013, Viktor Troicki refused to partake in a mandatory blood test carried out by the International Tennis Federation (ITF). As part of the 2013 anti-doping program administered by the governing body, it is compulsory that when requested by ITF staff, that players provide in and/or out-of-competition blood and urine testing. While it is possible for players to ask to be excused from such test, it is at the discretion of the ITF to postpone such tests.

Troicki stated he did not agree to the blood test as he was sick when the test was ordered by the ITF, however, he did provide the mandatory urine sample. In conjunction with his illness, Troicki also suffers from a phobia of needles that makes such tests difficult to administer. Having refused Troicki's claim, the ITF handed down an 18-month ban due to the failure to comply with the organisations anti-doping regulations. The initial ban prevented Troicki from competing professionally on the ITF Challenger or ATP World Tour from 26 July 2013 until 24 January 2015, missing the 2013 US Open, all the 2014 Grand Slams and 2015 Australian Open. The punishment also enforced the forfeiture of all ATP World Tour points and prize money received at the 2013 Monte Carlo Masters tennis tournament where he refused to participate in the blood test.

Troicki appealed the sentence to the Court of Arbitration for Sport in October 2013 and was successful in having his ban reduced by 6 months from 18 to a total 12-month ban. The new sentence prevented Troicki from competing professionally from 26 July 2013 to 26 July 2014 with the sentence recognising time already spent suspended from the game.

Troicki returned to professional tennis in July 2014 at a world ranking of 847 that prevented him from returning to the ATP World Tour. He returned to tournaments on the International Tennis Federation's Challenger circuit.

Doping in women's tennis

Martina Hingis (2007) 

In 2007, Martina Hingis tested positive to the drug Benzoylecgonine, a substance that has traces to cocaine. The International Tennis Federation (ITF) gave Hingis a two-year suspension from professional tennis that began on 1 October 2007 in conjunction with a forfeiture of her world ranking and a fine exceeding $120,000. Hingis challenged the ruling, however, this was refused by the ITF as she had already announced a retirement from the sport.

Hingis maintained her innocence stating she had never used cocaine and subsequently carried out a private drug test which returned a negative result. Despite the disparity in results, Hingis retired from professional tennis for the second time and did not formally challenge the ruling.

Hingis later returned to tennis in 2013, and attained the world number one ranking on the WTA women's doubles circuit.

Barbora Záhlavová-Strýcová (2013) 

In 2013, Barbora Záhlavová-Strýcová tested positive to the banned stimulant, sibutramine while competing at the 2013 Luxembourg Open. The drug is primarily used for weight loss with its effects on human metabolic function. The substance is widely prescribed to sufferers of obesity and diabetes with the main effect of the drug being an appetite suppressant. The drug was added to the World Anti-Doping Agency's banned substance list in 2012.

Záhlavová-Strýcová stated she did not deliberately ingest the drug to lose weight or cheat in competition, but did admit to using a weight-loss supplement Acai Berry Thin which has the substance as one of the ingredients. The International Tennis Federation (ITF) recognised that Zhalavova Strýcová did not intentionally take the drug for the benefit of her professional game and thus did not hand down the maximum two-year ban for illegal doping, however, she did receive a six-month ban from professional tennis. In conjunction with the suspension of play, Zhalavova Strýcová was also forced to forfeit all WTA Tour points and prize money from the 2012 Luxembourg Open and 2012 Buschl Open when the substance was in her body. The ban prevented Záhlavová-Strýcová competing from 16 October 2012 until 16 April 2013, ruling her out of the 2013 Australian Open.

Maria Sharapova (2016) 

In 2016, Maria Sharapova confessed to failing a WADA drug test while playing at the Australian Open in 2016. The substance used was a drug named meldonium that is used to treat heart disease with its effects on blood circulation through the transfer of fatty acids into the human body. Sharapova maintained there was no wrongdoing on her behalf, having admitted to using the prescription based drug for over ten years due to her susceptibility to influenza, treatment for symptoms of diabetes and magnesium deficiency.

On 1 January 2016, the drug was placed on the International Tennis Federation's banned substance list as it was ruled to have performance-enhancing effects. Such effects include increased blood circulation through the greater intake of oxygen that enables increased exercise ability and a reduced recovery period.

A report handed down by the International Tennis Federation and World Anti-Doping Agency found that while Sharapova may not have been consciously using the substance to increase performance, it is the responsibility of the player and team to be aware of new additions to the banned substance list. As a result, Sharapova was initially issued a two-year ban by the ITF that prevented her from competing professionally on the WTA World Tour until 25 January 2018.

Following an investigation by the Court of Arbitration for Sport in October 2016, Sharapova's ban was reduced from two years to 15 months after it was found there was no intention to cheat and no significant fault on her behalf. The ruling enabled Sharapova to return to competitive tennis on April 26, 2017.

During her ban Sharapova published her memoir, Unstoppable: My Life So Far, that was published in June 2018.

Sharapova returned to grand slam tennis at the 2018 US Open through a wildcard entry. She made it to the fourth round before losing to Anastasija Sevastova.

List of banned substances 
The list of banned substances in tennis as it stands in 2018 has been published by the International Tennis Federation (ITF). The prohibited substance list is categorised into the following:

Anabolic agents: include the use of anabolic steroids that increase testosterone levels in players. The drug is prohibited as it hastens the process of muscle growth in athletes and allows for limited recovery time post matches. A full list of itemised anabolic agents is listed on the ITF website.
Peptide hormones: include the use of drugs with amino acid chains that accelerate human growth in protein based hormones. The use of such substances can accelerate the development of muscle tissue and testosterone levels within the body.
Beta-2 agonists: include substances that effect the adrenergic receptor in humans, increase insulin levels and stabilise breathing function.
Hormone and metabolic modulators: include drugs that effect the levels of oestrogen in both males and females. Such substances can prevent the conversion of testosterone into oestrogen and effect the levels of growth of these hormones in the human body. Due to the change on hormones, the use of these agents can also effect athletes metabolism.
Diuretics and masking agents: include drugs that have a diuretic effect on athletes allowing increased consumption of fluids that can aid the stimulation of red blood cells to prevent fatigue and mediate the effects of high blood pressure. These substances can also dilute certain doping agents in the urine, and so are used by athletes to pass drug tests.

List of banned doping methods 

In addition to the publication of an official list of banned substances, the International Tennis Federation (ITF) has published a list of banned practices that are considered acts of illegal doping within tennis.

Blood doping: includes the use of substances to increase red blood cell levels to regulate oxygen levels within the body, increasing athlete performance and recovery. Examples of blood doping include direct manipulation of the red blood cell count by injecting athletes with additional red blood cells and the retrieving and storing method that involves blood samples being collected, stored and then re-entered into the body once the cell count has returned to normal levels.
Chemical doping: involves the manipulation of blood and drug samples provided by athletes and intravenous injections except for acceptable hospital treatments.
Gene doping: is similar to blood doping in that additional genes are injected to an athlete's body to increase performance. This can include the additional supply of the human growth hormone, insulin or cortisol regulators.

While it is not recognised as a doping method, the un/intentional avoidance or missed drug test carried out by the ITF or other anti-doping body is also recognised as a type of doping offence. While the player may not have banned substances within their system, a missed test can result in a ban from professional competition of up to two years.

Controversies surrounding anti-doping policy 
Anti-doping policy remains controversial due to the large amount of substances, ingredients and chemicals that athletes are prohibited from being exposed to.

Controversy surrounds inadvertent cases of doping, such as those by Richard Gasquet (The Cocaine Kiss Controversy) and Maria Sharapova (long used drug added to the prohibited list without knowledge). While in both cases these players were ruled not to be at fault, the strict measures led to legal battle and damage to players reputation.

Another controversy surrounding doping policy is the strict times at which testing can be carried out that players must hold themselves to or face potential repercussions, as seen with Viktor Troicki in 2013. The issue was raised by Serena Williams in 2018 when she was absent from an out-of-competition test that was conducted by the United States Anti-Doping Agency (USADA) outside the hours that were previously agreed upon by Williams and the organisation. Another issue raised by Williams is the inconsistency of testing. While the ITF, WADA and USADA use randomised testing with the consent of players, there is overlap with certain tests with Williams being tested five times before playing at Wimbledon in 2018 whereas other players had not been subject to the random, out-of-competition test.

See also
Doping in sport
Doping in the United States

References 

Doping in sport
Tennis controversies